Oona Kivelä (born in 1983) is a Finnish professional acrobat and a four-time world champion pole dancer.

Oona Kivelä started doing gymnastics at the age of nine. She competed in gymnastics until the age of 24. In 2008 – at the age of 25 – Kivelä became interested in pole dance in New York City, after having read an article about pole dance in Finland half year before.  In 2011, Oona Kivelä won both Finnish championship in pole dance as well as the international Pole Art 2011 championship.

Oona Kivelä designs the choreography for her performances herself.

She has also done modeling for various sports magazines starring the cover pages. 

The pole champion has also done collab work with acrobat Santeri Koivisto. The project, For Your Eyes Only by Kingdom Helsinki consists in a glamorous and exclusive act that mixes pole dancing, acrobatics, hand balancing and contortion.

Notable achievements
 Winner - International Pole Art Competition, 2009 
 Winner - Pole Dance North-European Championships, 2009 
 Winner - Finnish Pole Dance Championships, 2010 
 Winner - Pole World Cup, 2011 
 Winner - International Pole Art Competition, 2011 
 Winner - Pole Art, 2012 
 Winner - International Pole Championship, 2012 
 Winner - International Pole Championship, 2013 
 Winner - International Pole Championship, 2014 
 Winner – International Pole Championship, 2015 
 Winner – Finnish Pole Dance Championships, 2016

References

External links
 Oona Kivelä - Oona Kivelä official website.
 IPDFA/IPC - International Pole Championship - "Ultimate Pole Champion".

Finnish female dancers
Living people
1983 births